Willem Theo "Wim" Grothuis (born 16 December 1944) is a retired Dutch rower. He competed at the 1972 Summer Olympics in the coxed fours, together with Evert Kroes, Jan-Willem van Woudenberg, Johan ter Haar and Kees de Korver, and finished in seventh place. His team finished ninth in this event at the 1971 European Championships.

References

1944 births
Living people
Dutch male rowers
Olympic rowers of the Netherlands
Rowers at the 1972 Summer Olympics
Rowers from Amsterdam